Viktor Sokolov (born 24 April 1954) is a Soviet former cyclist. He won a silver medal in the team pursuit (4000 m) event at the 1976 Summer Olympics. in Montreal.

References

External links
 

1954 births
Living people
Soviet male cyclists
Cyclists at the 1976 Summer Olympics
Medalists at the 1976 Summer Olympics
Olympic cyclists of the Soviet Union
Olympic medalists in cycling
Olympic silver medalists for the Soviet Union
People from Podolsk